Rosedale, also known as Frew's Folly, is a historic plantation house located at Charlotte, Mecklenburg County, North Carolina.  It was built about 1815, and is a Federal style frame dwelling. It consists of a -story, three bay by two bay, central block flanked by -story wings. It is sheathed in molded weatherboard and rests on a stone basement. Each section has a gable roof.  The central block is flanked by exterior brick chimneys.

It was listed on the National Register of Historic Places in 1972.

The restored house and gardens are open to the public.

References

External links
 Historic Rosedale Plantation

Plantation houses in North Carolina
Houses on the National Register of Historic Places in North Carolina
Federal architecture in North Carolina
Houses completed in 1807
Houses in Charlotte, North Carolina
National Register of Historic Places in Mecklenburg County, North Carolina
Museums in Charlotte, North Carolina
Historic house museums in North Carolina